Talking may refer to:

 Speech, the product of the action of to talk
 Communication by spoken words; conversation or discussion

Music
 "Talking" (A Flock of Seagulls song), 1983
 "Talking" (The Rifles song), 2007
 "Talking", a song by A House from their 1990 album I Want Too Much
 "Talking", a song by the Boys from their 1978 album Alternative Chartbusters
 "Talking", a song by the Descendents from their 2004 album Cool to Be You
 "Talking", a song by Essie Jain from her 2007 album We Made This Ourselves
 "Talking", a song by Fiction Plane from their 2010 album Sparks
 "Talking", a song by London Grammar from their 2021 album Californian Soil
 "Talking", a song by the Rifles from their 2009 album Great Escape (Japanese edition)
 "Talking", a song by September Girls from their 2014 album Cursing the Sea
 "Talking", a song by Slovenly from their 1989 album We Shoot for the Moon
 "Talkin'", a song by Brass Construction from their 1975 album Brass Construction
 "Talkin'", a song by Najee from his 1990 album Tokyo Blue
 "Talkin'", a song by Switch from their 1975 album White Heat
 "Talkin'", a song by Three 6 Mafia from their 2001 album Choices: The Album
 "Talkin'", a song by Ty Segall from his 2017 album Ty Segall
 "Talkin'", a song by Van She from their 2008 album V
 "Talkin", a song by Kojey Radical from his 2022 album Reason to Smile

Other uses
 Talking with Chris Hardwick, a talk show

See also
 Talking With..., a 1982 play
 Talk (disambiguation)
 Talking Head (disambiguation)
 Talking point (disambiguation)